is a private high school in Motosu, Gifu Prefecture, Japan. Established in 1957, it is a part of the Shohsui Gakuen Group (学校法人松翠学園) and is Gifu Prefecture's sole school only for boys.

See also
Other institutions operated by Shohsui Gakuen Group:
 Shiga Bunkyo Junior College

References

External links

 Gifu Daiichi High School 
 English

Education in Gifu Prefecture
High schools in Gifu Prefecture
1958 establishments in Japan
Educational institutions established in 1958
Boys' schools in Japan
Motosu, Gifu